Violet Journey is the debut studio album by guitarist Orianthi. The album was recorded and self-released in 2006, however it was officially released to the Australian mass market on 4 June 2007 via a distribution deal with Universal Music Australia.

Track listing
All songs written by Orianthi
"Lights of Manos" – 2:58
"He's Gone" – 3:21
"Violet Journey" – 3:10
"Everyday" – 4:46
"Here on Earth" – 4:18
"Right Now" – 4:24
"Anybody Else" – 4:52
"Out of Reach" – 5:08
"Wouldn't Change a Thing" – 4:22
"Anaheim (live in studio)" – 4:13

References

2007 debut albums
Orianthi albums
Self-released albums